Bidur Prasad Sapkota is Nepalese politician, belonging to the Communist Party of Nepal (Unified Socialist). In 2013, he won the Kavre–4 seat in the 2nd Nepalese Constituent Assembly with total votes of 16, 754.

References

Year of birth missing (living people)
Living people
Communist Party of Nepal (Unified Socialist) politicians
People from Kavrepalanchok District
Members of the 2nd Nepalese Constituent Assembly